James Murdoch (1844-1914) was "an important architect in Denver in the late 19th and early 20th centuries."    Several of his works are listed on the National Register of Historic Places. At least two of his works have been designated Denver landmarks.

He was born in Scotland in 1844.  He arrived in Denver in 1888.  He died in 1914.

He served as superintendent of the Colorado State Capitol, with office in the building, and as such was a contributing architect in its completion.

Works include:
All Saints Episcopal Church (Denver) (1890), at 2222 W. 32nd Avenue, NRHP-listed
The Grafton (1890), 1001-1020 E. 17th Ave., Denver, NRHP-listed
T. E. Swarz residence (1890), on Pearl Street between 10th and 11th Avenues, Denver, since demolished
John C. Gallup residence (1891), at 1763 Williams Street, Denver, since demolished
Worker housing, store, school, offices (1906) in Cokedale, Colorado, a coal mining company town, NRHP-listed as Cokedale Historic District 
Simon Guggenheim Hall, Boulder, at the University of Colorado at Boulder.

References

19th-century American architects
Architects from Colorado
People from Denver
1844 births
1914 deaths
20th-century American architects